SuperMama is an Arabic parenting portal directed to mothers in the Middle East. It provides different types of written and visual localized content to mothers in the region, from getting pregnant, raising kids, managing home, and taking care of her health and beauty. The website has been online since October 2011. Supermama was included in the Forbes list of the most visited websites in the Middle East for 2021.

History
SuperMama was established in October 2011 by entrepreneurs Yasmine El-Mehairy and Zeinab Samir as a source of information for mothers and mothers-to-be in Egypt and in MENA. The company is based in Cairo, Egypt.

Awards

References

Internet properties established in 2011
Egyptian websites
Companies based in Cairo
Parenting websites